Charles Spencer-Churchill may refer to:

Lord Charles Spencer-Churchill (1794–1840), British nobleman
Charles Henry Spencer-Churchill (1828–1877), British officer
Charles Spencer-Churchill, 9th Duke of Marlborough (1871–1934)
James Spencer-Churchill, 12th Duke of Marlborough (born 1955), full name Charles James Spencer-Churchill

See also
Charles Spencer (disambiguation)